Greg Strobel (August 17, 1952 – October 8, 2020) was an American wrestler, coach, and member of the National Wrestling Hall of Fame from Scappoose, Oregon. From 1995 to 2008, he was the head coach at Bethlehem, Pennsylvania-based Lehigh University, one of the top wrestling programs in the country.

Strobel won two NCAA titles and was a three-time All-American at Oregon State, finishing his college career with a 126-8-1 record before starting his coaching career. He was an assistant coach at Oregon State University, a head high school coach at Roseburg High School, a US Wrestling official and a private club coach before taking the head coaching job at Lehigh in 1995, where he held an endowed chair: the Lawrence White Head Coach of Wrestling. He led Lehigh to five consecutive EIWA championships and multiple Top-Ten NCAA championship finishes. He coached two national champions.

He was inducted into the National Wrestling Hall of Fame in 2012, the Oregon State University Sports Hall of Fame in 1993, and the Oregon Sports Hall of Fame in 2016. Strobel died on October 8, 2020, at the age of 68.

References

External links 
Lehigh Athletics Mourns the Passing of Greg Strobel

1952 births
2020 deaths
American male sport wrestlers
American wrestling coaches
Lehigh Mountain Hawks coaches
Oregon State Beavers wrestlers
Oregon State Beavers wrestling coaches
Sportspeople from Bethlehem, Pennsylvania
People from Scappoose, Oregon
People from Prairie County, Montana
Deaths from cancer in the United States